Pavel Andreyevich Yakushevskiy (born 24 September 1987) is a Russian professional racing cyclist. He rode at the 2015 UCI Track Cycling World Championships. He graduated from Lesgaft National State University of Physical Education, Sport and Health.

References

External links
 

1987 births
Living people
Russian male cyclists
Russian track cyclists
Cyclists from Moscow
Lesgaft National State University of Physical Education, Sport and Health alumni
Universiade medalists in cycling
Universiade silver medalists for Russia
European Games competitors for Russia
Cyclists at the 2019 European Games
Medalists at the 2011 Summer Universiade
Cyclists at the 2020 Summer Olympics
Olympic cyclists of Russia